Air cadets may refer to:

 Members of the British Air Training Corps 
 Members of the RAF section of the Combined Cadet Force
 Members of the Australian Air Force Cadets
 Members of the Belgian Air Cadets
 Members of the Royal Canadian Air Cadets
 Members of the New Zealand Air Training Corps, New Zealand Cadet Forces
 Cadets at the United States Air Force Academy or in Air Force Reserve Officers Training Corps 
 Cadet Members of the Civil Air Patrol, the US Air Force Auxiliary 
 Members of the Hong Kong Air Cadet Corps

See also 
 Air Cadet (film), a 1951 film directed by Joseph Pevney
 Air Cadets (film), a 1944 Canadian propaganda film